Arwen Undómiel is a fictional character in J. R. R. Tolkien's Middle-earth legendarium. She appears in the novel The Lord of the Rings. Arwen is one of the half-elven who lived during the Third Age; her father was Elrond half-elven, lord of the Elvish sanctuary of Rivendell, while her mother was the Elf Celebrian, daughter of the Elf-queen Galadriel, ruler of Lothlórien. She marries the Man Aragorn, who becomes King of Arnor and Gondor.

In Peter Jackson's film adaptation, Arwen is played by Liv Tyler. She plays a more active role in the film than in the book, personally rescuing the Hobbit Frodo from the Black Riders at the Fords of Bruinen (a role played by Glorfindel in the book).

Narrative 

Arwen was the youngest child of Elrond, lord of the Elvish sanctuary of Rivendell and leader of the High Elves remaining in Middle-earth at the end of the Third Age, and Celebrían, daughter of Galadriel, ruler of the Elvish forest realm of Lothlórien. Her elder brothers were the twins Elladan and Elrohir. Her name "Ar-wen" means 'noble maiden' in Sindarin. She was given the name "Evenstar" as the most beautiful of the last generation of High Elves in Middle-earth.

As told in "The Tale of Aragorn and Arwen", in his twentieth year Aragorn met Arwen for the first time in Rivendell, where he lived under Elrond's protection. Arwen, then over 2,700 years old, had recently returned to her father's home after living with her grandmother, Galadriel, in Lothlórien. Aragorn fell in love with Arwen at first sight. Thirty years later, the two were reunited in Lothlórien. Arwen reciprocated Aragorn's love, and on the mound of Cerin Amroth they committed themselves to marrying each other. In making that choice, Arwen gave up the Elvish immortality available to her as a daughter of Elrond, and agreed to remain in Middle-earth instead of travelling to the Undying Lands.

Arwen first appears in the text of The Lord of the Rings in Rivendell, shortly after Frodo Baggins wakes in the House of Elrond: she sits beside her father at the celebratory feast. When the Fellowship of the Ring comes to Lothlórien, Aragorn remembers his earlier meeting with Arwen and pauses in reverence.

Shortly before Aragorn takes the Paths of the Dead, he is joined by a contingent of his people accompanied by Arwen's brothers, Elladan and Elrohir, who bring him a gift from Arwen: a banner of black cloth. The banner is unfurled at the Battle of the Pelennor Fields to reveal the emblem of Elendil figured in mithril, gems, and gold; this becomes the first triumphant public announcement of the king's return.

After the ring is destroyed, Aragorn becomes king of Arnor and Gondor. Arwen arrives at Minas Tirith, and they are married. She gives Frodo the Evenstar: her necklace with a white stone, to aid him when his injuries trouble him.

Arwen serves as inspiration and motivation for Aragorn, who must become King of both Arnor and Gondor before Elrond will allow her to marry him. The Tale of Aragorn and Arwen, an appendix to the main story, relates that Aragorn and Arwen had a son, Eldarion, and at least two unnamed daughters. One year after Aragorn's death, Arwen dies at the age of 2,901.

Background

Through her father, Elrond, Arwen was the granddaughter of Eärendil the Mariner (the second of the Half-elven), great-granddaughter of Tuor of Gondolin, and therefore a direct descendant of the ancient House of Hador. Through her great-grandmother, Idril, Arwen was also a descendant of King Turgon of the Noldor. Through her mother, she was the granddaughter of the Elf-queen Galadriel of Lothlórien, and the great-granddaughter of Finarfin. Through both of her parents, Arwen was a direct descendant of the ancient Elven House of Finwë. Furthermore, Arwen was a descendant of Beren and Lúthien, whose story resembled hers. Indeed, Arwen was held to be the reappearance in likeness of her ancestor Lúthien, fairest of all the Elves, who was called Nightingale (Tinúviel).

Arwen was a distant relative of her husband Aragorn. Aragorn's ancestor, Elros Tar-Minyatur, the first King of Númenor, was her father Elrond's brother, who chose to live as a Man rather than as one of the Eldar. Arwen eventually became Queen of the Reunited Kingdom of Arnor and Gondor when she married Aragorn, who was of the line of the Kings of Arnor. By Arwen and Aragorn's marriage, the long-separated lines of the Half-elven were joined. Their union served to unite and preserve the bloodlines of the three kings of the high Elves (Ingwë, Finwë, and the brothers Olwë and Elwë) as well as the only line with Maiarin blood through Arwen's great-great-great grandmother, Melian, Queen of Doriath, and also on Aragorn's side, through the line of kings of Arnor and Númenor to Elros, Elrond's brother, whose great-great-grandmother was also Melian.

Analysis

As related in The History of Middle-earth, Tolkien conceived the character of "Elrond's daughter" late in the writing. Prior to this, he considered having Aragorn marry Éowyn of the royal family of Rohan.

Arwen is depicted as extremely beautiful; she is in Melissa Hatcher's view in Mythlore "a symbol of the unattainable, a perfect match for the unattainable Aragorn in Éowyn's eyes." Carol Leibiger wrote in the J.R.R. Tolkien Encyclopedia that Arwen's lack of involvement follows the general Elvish pattern of retreating to safe havens already established in The Silmarillion and continued in The Lord of the Rings.

The scholar of English literature Nancy Enright wrote that Arwen, like Christ, is an immortal who voluntarily chooses mortality out of love, in her case for Aragorn. She granted that Arwen is not a conspicuous character, and unlike Éowyn does not ride into battle, but stated that her inner power is "subtly conveyed" and present throughout the novel.

Adaptations

Peter Jackson's film series

In Peter Jackson's The Lord of the Rings film trilogy, Arwen is played by Liv Tyler. The films give her a more prominent role than her literary counterpart. 
In the first film, Arwen searches for Aragorn and single-handedly rescues Frodo Baggins from the Black Riders at Bruinen, thwarting them with a sudden flood, summoned by an incantation. (In the novel, Elrond summons the flood, and Glorfindel lends Frodo his horse.) During this flight Arwen wields the sword Hadhafang, which according to film merchandise was once wielded by her father and had belonged to his grandmother Idril Celebrindal.

In the film adaptation of The Two Towers, the injured Aragorn is revived by a dream or vision of Arwen, who kisses him and asks the Valar to protect him. 

In the film, Arwen does not send Aragorn the banner she has made; instead, Elrond takes the sword Narsil, reforged as Andúril, to Aragorn at Dunharrow, and tells him that Arwen's fate has become bound to the One Ring, and that she is dying. The Tolkien scholar Janet Brennan Croft comments that Jackson makes Arwen passive, denying her independence of mind; from being a constant support, she is a distraction, even a temptation, to the American Superhero, and their marriage, in the book a sign of his rightful kingship, is in the film something he accepts as if he was condemned to it. 

In the extended version, Elrond asks Arwen, in Elvish with English subtitles, to accompany him to safety in Valinor, away from Middle-earth. 

The Tolkien scholar Dimitra Fimi comments that the procession of Elves in the scene "Arwen's vision" in the extended version borrows visually from the "Celtic" imagery of John Duncan's 1911 Pre-Raphaelite painting Riders of the Sidhe. 
Sauron uses the Palantír to show Aragorn a dying Arwen (a scene from the future) in the hope of weakening his resolve. 

The films portray Arwen as becoming human through her love for Aragorn; as in the novel, she follows the choice of her ancestor Lúthien to become a mortal woman for the love of a mortal man. The films introduce a jewelled pendant called the Evenstar which Arwen gives to Aragorn as a token of their love. A similar pendant appears in Marion Zimmer Bradley's short story The Jewel of Arwen, although in that story Arwen gives it to "the Ring-Bearer" rather than to Aragorn. In Tolkien's novel, Arwen gives Frodo "a white gem like a star...hanging upon a silver chain" before he leaves Minas Tirith, saying, "When the memory of the fear and the darkness troubles you...this will bring you aid".

In earlier versions of the script, Arwen fought in the Battle of Helm's Deep and brought the sword Andúril to Aragorn. Some scenes of Arwen fighting in Helm's Deep were filmed before both the film's writers (with Liv Tyler's approval) reconsidered the change and deleted her from the sequence. The critic John D. Rateliff wrote approvingly of the deletion of what he calls "Arwen, Warrior Princess", even though it came "at the cost of reducing her to a sort of Lady of Shallott languishing for most of the final two films". 

In the Mythopoeic Society's  Tolkien on Film: Essays on Peter Jackson's The Lord of the Rings, Cathy Akers-Jordan, Victoria Gaydosik, Jane Chance, and Maureen Thum all contend that the portrayal of Arwen and other women in the Jackson films is thematically faithful to or compatible with Tolkien's writings, despite the differences.

Other 

In the 1981 BBC radio serialisation of The Lord of the Rings, Arwen is voiced by Sonia Fraser. In the musical theatre adaptation of Lord of the Rings, Arwen, played in London in 2007 by Rosalie Craig, sings the Prologue, and three musical numbers: "The Song of Hope", "Star of Eärendil" (with the Elven chorus) and "The Song of Hope Duet" (with Aragorn). In the 2009 fan film The Hunt for Gollum, Arwen is played by Rita Ramnani.

The Lord of the Rings board game made use of a rendition of Arwen by Jackson's conceptual designer, the illustrator John Howe; the work was inspired by the French actress Isabelle Adjani.

Namesakes

The International Astronomical Union names all colles (small hills) on Saturn's moon Titan after characters in Tolkien's work. In 2012, they named a hilly area "Arwen Colles" after Arwen.

Notes

References

Primary 
This list identifies each item's location in Tolkien's writings.

Secondary

Sources 

 
 
 
 
 
 

Female characters in film
Female characters in literature
Fictional women soldiers and warriors
Fictional queens
Literary characters introduced in 1954
The Lord of the Rings characters
Middle-earth Half-elven